Choi Hyun-soo (born 3 April 1960) is a South Korean journalist who previously served as the Spokesperson of the Ministry of National Defense from 2017 to 2020 - the first woman to assume this post in the Ministry's history. 

Choi was previously the first woman to become the Ministry correspondent in 2002 and a military specialist in 2009 respectively. Before resigning for her new career in public service, she had worked as a journalist at Kukmin Ilbo for almost three decades from 1988.

She hosted a television show at the Ministry-run media agency and completed a doctorate programme at the Ministry-run Korea National Defense University.

Choi retired from post in June 2020. A year later she was brought back to public service as the head of Defense Agency for Spiritual & Mental Force Enhancement of the Ministry.  

She holds two degrees - a bachelor in political science from Yonsei University and a master's in international relations from University of Chicago.

Awards 

 The 28th Choi Eun-hee Female Journalist Award (2011)
 Award from Korean Women Journalist Association (2011)

References 

Yonsei University alumni
University of Chicago alumni
1960 births
Living people
South Korean women journalists
South Korean government officials
South Korean journalists